Roman Mashovets (born 1976) is a Ukrainian politician and social activist. Deputy Head of the Office of the President of Ukraine.

Early life 

He graduated from the Military Diplomatic Academy. He is a veteran of military intelligence and special forces.

Roman Mashovets is a military officer: from the Ivan Bohun Military High School in 1993 to the Foreign Intelligence Department of the Chief Directorate of Intelligence of the Ministry of Defence of Ukraine in 2008.

After graduating from the military school, he began serving in the naval special forces – combat swimmers.

He served in the special purpose unit of the Chief Directorate of Intelligence of the Ministry of Defence of Ukraine, in the peacekeeping mission in Sierra Leone, as well as in the Ukrainian contingent in Iraq.

Since July 2014, he has been engaged in the organization of military-technical assistance for the Ukrainian Army.

Roman Mashovets stood at the origins of the creation of the Special Operations Forces of the Armed Forces of Ukraine.

He conducted 25 trips to the war zone in the east of Ukraine.

Political career 

Roman Mashovets founded the charitable public organization "National Values ​​of Ukraine", which is engaged in tracking modern trends in the national security and defense sector, researching the real state of the Ukrainian army, preparing analytical reports that are sent to the state structures of Ukraine and the United States, and the problematic issues of reintegration of temporarily occupied territories.

Since April 22, 2020, he was appointed Deputy Head of the Office of the President of Ukraine.

He is a member of the National Council on Anti-Corruption Policy (since June 1, 2020).

References 

Living people
1976 births
Ukrainian politicians
Ukrainian activists
Presidential Administration of Ukraine